Betondorp (Concrete Village) is a neighbourhood of Amsterdam, Netherlands. It was built in the 1920s as an experiment in building affordable housing with new, cheap building materials, chiefly concrete.

The houses are built in a sober, minimalist form of Art Deco.

Betondorp is located in the Watergraafsmeer neighbourhood.

Footballer Johan Cruyff was born and raised in Betondorp. In his teens he joined Ajax, his hometown club that had their stadium and training ground right across from where he grew up. Another Betondorp native is writer Gerard Reve who based the setting of his novel The Evenings on Betondorp.

References

Amsterdam-Oost
Neighbourhoods of Amsterdam